Rasputin is a coming of age romantic comedy, Malayalam film directed by Jinu G. Daniel, released on 7 August 2015 . The film stars Vinay Forrt as the central character, with Sreenath Bhasi, Aju Varghese, director Joy Mathew, Vandana Menon and Archana Gupta. Rasputin is being produced by E.P. Varghese under the banner of Blue Moon Pictures, Executive Producer Shaju Maniyadath. Cinematography is handled by  Hari Nair from Mumbai.

Cast
 Vinay Forrt as Susheelan / Susheel
 Sreenath Bhasi as Radhenathan/Radhs
 Aju Varghese as Gopalan / Gops
 Joy Mathew as Vayalil Satheesan
 Nandhu
 Sunil Sukhada
 Vandana Menon as Dr. Smitha
 Archana Gupta as Ambili
 Srinda Ashab
 Shritha Sivadas
 Prasanth Prado
Arya
 Suraj C Nair

Soundtrack
Roby Abraham is the music director for the movie. Background score was by Vimal T.K.. The lyrics for the songs have been penned by Arun K. Narayanan, Joe Paul and Rafeeq Ahmed.

Reception 
A critic from The Times of India wrote that "The director fails to produce anything funny while stitching together a tale".

References

References

2015 films
2010s Malayalam-language films
2015 directorial debut films